Lessines is a city and municipality of Wallonia located in the province of Hainaut, Belgium. As of the 2014 census, The municipality's total population was 18,637. The total area is 72.29 km² (27.91 square miles) which gives a population density of 247 inhabitants per km².

The municipality consists of the following districts: Bois-de-Lessines, Deux-Acren, Ghoy, Lessines, Ogy, Ollignies, Papignies, and Wannebecq.

Lessines is a municipality of Picardy Wallonia. It is primarily known as the birthplace of the Surrealist painter René Magritte (1898 – 1967).

History

Postal history
The Lessines post office opened before 1830. It used postal code 71 with bars (before 1864), and 214 with points before 1874. Deux-Acren post office opened on 15 May 1866. It used postal code 104 with points before 1874. The Papignies post office opened on 18 February 1880, Ghoy and Ollignies on 25 May 1905, and Ogy on 5 November 1907.

Postal codes in 1969: 7850 Ollignies - 7851 Bois-de-Lessines - 7860 Lessines - 7861 Papignies - 7862 Ogy - 7863 Ghoy - 7870 Deux-Acren

Postal codes since at least 1990: 7860 Lessines - 7861 Papignies, Wannebecq (not opened in 1969) - 7862 Ogy - 7863 Ghoy - 7864 Deux-Acren - 7866 Bois-de-Lessines, Ollignies

Culture
The Underwear Museum, created by Jan Bucquoy, is in Lessines; it moved from Brussels to Lessines in 2016.

Gallery

References

External links
 
 Official website (in French)
  Another site, with further information on the city (in French, Dutch, and English)
  Another site, with information in French

Cities in Wallonia
Municipalities of Hainaut (province)